The Real Chuckeeboo is the fourth album by British R&B group Loose Ends. It is the last album to feature all three original members; Carl McIntosh, Jane Eugene and Steve Nichol.  Mainly written and produced by Loose Ends and co-produced by longtime collaborator Nick Martinelli, it also features contributions from Leon Ware and Caron Wheeler.

The Real Chuckeeboo reached #52 in the United Kingdom. In the USA it peaked at #16 on the R&B chart and #80 on the Billboard albums chart. Between the years 1991-2009 the album sold an additional 48,000 copies in the United States according to Nielsen Soundscan 3 years after its initial release, the album remains uncertified with overall sells unknown.

Track listing

Charts

Singles

References

External links

Loose Ends (band) albums
1988 albums